Eric Washington (born October 29, 1969) is an American football coach who is the senior defensive assistant and defensive line coach for the Buffalo Bills of the National Football League (NFL). He previously served as the defensive line coach for the Buffalo Bills following experience as the defensive coordinator for the Carolina Panthers and defensive line coach for the Chicago Bears.

NFL Coaching career

Chicago Bears
In 2008, Washington was hired as a defensive assistant by the Chicago Bears. He was promoted to defensive line coach in 2010.

Carolina Panthers
Washington was hired by the Carolina Panthers as their defensive line coach in 2011. In January 2018, Washington was promoted to defensive coordinator of the Carolina Panthers after Steve Wilks was named head coach of the Arizona Cardinals.

Buffalo Bills
On January 10, 2020, Washington was hired by the Buffalo Bills as their defensive line coach. With this new role, he rejoined former Carolina Panthers defensive coordinator Sean McDermott, who is now the head coach of the Buffalo Bills.

On March 15, 2022, Washington was promoted by the Buffalo Bills as their senior defensive assistant/defensive line coach.

References

External links
Carolina Panthers bio

Living people
1969 births
African-American coaches of American football
Buffalo Bills coaches
Carolina Panthers coaches
Chicago Bears coaches
Grambling State Tigers football players
Northwestern Wildcats football coaches
Ohio Bobcats football coaches
People from Grambling, Louisiana
Texas A&M Aggies football coaches
Sportspeople from Louisiana
21st-century African-American people
20th-century African-American sportspeople